Cypress Lawn Memorial Park, established by Hamden Holmes Noble in 1892, is a rural cemetery located in Colma, California, a place known as the "City of the Silent".

History 
Cypress Lawn Memorial Park is the final resting site for several members of the celebrated Hearst family, people from the California Gold Rush, plus other prominent citizens from the city of San Francisco and nearby surroundings.

Three British Commonwealth service personnel of World War I were buried here, but only one, Lieutenant Norman Travers Simpkin (died 1919), Royal Field Artillery, has a marked grave in the cemetery. Two others, Canadian Army soldiers, are alternatively commemorated on a special memorial in Greenlawn Memorial Park in Colma.

The idea of rural or garden cemeteries (as opposed to city cemeteries) became popular in the mid 19th-century in the United States, and cities like San Francisco began relocating their badly maintained urban cemeteries to suburban settings. Between February 1940 until 1945, many of the remains from the Lone Mountain Cemetery complex in San Francisco had been moved to Cypress Lawn Memorial Park and were placed in a mound. In 1993, a memorial obelisk was added to the grassy mound to commemorate those that had been re-interred.

The cemetery was among those profiled in the PBS documentary A Cemetery Special (2005) by Rick Sebak.

Notable burials

A 
 Isabella Macdonald Alden (1841–1930), writer
 Izora Armstead (1942–2004), singer and member of The Weather Girls
 Gertrude Franklin (Horn) Atherton (1857–1948), author
 Monte Attell (1885–1960), world boxing champion

B 
 Hubert Howe Bancroft (1832–1918), pre-eminent writer of California history
 Lincoln Beachey (1887–1915), aviation pioneer
 David Colbreth Broderick (1820–1859), U.S. Senator from California; opponent of slavery, considered martyred in a duel by a pro-slavery opponent.
 Arthur Brown (1874–1957), prominent San Francisco architect
 Samuel D. Burris (1813–1863), Underground Railroad conductor

C 
 Dolph Camilli (1907–1997), 1941 National League's Baseball Most Valuable Player
 R. C. Chambers (1832–1901), businessperson, politician, owner of the Chambers Mansion in San Francisco
 John C. Cremony (1815–1879), soldier, author, newsman
 Joseph Paul Cretzer (1911–1946), bank robber and prisoner, died in the escape attempt known as the "Battle of Alcatraz"
 Laura Hope Crews (1879–1942), actress
 William H. Crocker (1861–1937), banker

D 
 Anne McKee Armstrong de Saint Cyr (1864–1925), philanthropist, mother of Princess Miguel of Braganza, Duchess of Viseu
 Jean de Saint Cyr (1875–1966), playboy third husband of Anne McKee Armstrong de Saint Cyr

F 
 Abby Fisher (c. 1832–1915), former slave and cookbook author
 Eddie Fisher (1928–2010), entertainer
 James Clair Flood (1826–1889), "Bonanza King"

G 
 Phineas Gage (1823–1860), noted brain-injury survivor
 Jack Bee Garland (1869–1936), author, transgender man

H 
 Andrew Smith Hallidie (1836–1900), first cable car system designer, Inventor
 George Hearst (1820–1891), businessman, father of William Randolph Hearst
 Phoebe Hearst (1842–1919), first female Regent of the University of California
 William Randolph Hearst (1863–1951), publishing magnate
 Charles S. Howard (1877–1950), businessman, owner of racehorse Seabiscuit

J 
 Hiram W. Johnson (1866–1945), statesman, governor

L 
 Thomas O. Larkin (1802–1858), businessman, signer of the original California Constitution
 Edwin M. Lee (1952–2017), 43rd Mayor of San Francisco
 William Lobb (1809–1864), English botanist and plant collector
 Frederick Low (1828–1894), Congressman, California Governor, statesman

M 
 Willie McCovey (1938–2018), Major League Baseball Hall of Famer
 Addison Mizner (1872–1933), architect
 Tom Mooney (1882–1942), Wobblie, political prisoner
 William W. Morrow (1843–1929), U.S. Congressman, American Red Cross incorporator
 James Murdock (1931–1981), American film and television actor

N 
 James Van Ness (1808–1872), 7th Mayor of San Francisco

O 
 Lefty O'Doul (1897–1969), Major League Baseball player
 Betty Ong (1956–2001), September 11 attacks victim

P 
 Joel Samuel Polack (1807–1882), trader, land speculator, writer and artist in pre-colonial New Zealand
 Grace Gimmini Potts (1886–1956), author and director of pageants

R 
 Alvino Rey (1908–1980), jazz guitarist and bandleader

S 
 Calvin E. Simmons (1950–1982), musical prodigy, conductor, musician
 Jack Spicer (1925–1965), poet
 Lincoln Steffens (1866–1936), McClure's magazine writer, muckraking journalist
 Charlie Sweeney (1863–1902), Major League Baseball player

T 
 David S. Terry (1823–1889), American judge of the California Supreme Court and politician

W 
 Walter Varney (1888–1967), Founder of predecessors of United and Continental Airlines

See also
 List of cemeteries in California

References

External links

 
 "Notables" at cypresslawn.com
 

Cemeteries in San Mateo County, California
Protected areas of San Mateo County, California
History of San Mateo County, California
1892 establishments in California
Rural cemeteries